S. V. Venugopan Nair (18 April 1945 – 23 August 2022) was an Indian writer, who wrote in Malayalam.

Biography 
He was born on 18 April 1945, to P. Sadasivan Thampi and J. V. Vishalakshiamma, in Neyyattinkara, in the present-day Trivandrum district of Kerala, India. 

He completed his education from Kulathoor High School in Neyyattinkara and University College, Trivandrum. He completed Bachelor of Arts, Master of Arts, Master of Philosophy and Doctor of Philosophy degrees in Malayalam literature. He started working as a college lecturer in 1965. He worked in Scott Christian College in Nagercoil and in several colleges managed by Nair Service Society in Kerala, including the N.S.S. College, Cherthala, the VTM NSS College, Dhanuvachapuram, the NSS College, Nilamel, the NSS College, Ottapalam and the N.S.S College, Manjeri. 

He was married to Valsala, and the couple had two sons and a daughter. 

Nair died on 23 August 2022, at the age of 77.

List of works

Short story collections 
 Mruthithalam (Kottayam: S.P.C.S., 1979)
 Adiseshan (Kottayam: N.B.S., 1983)
 Rekhayillatha Oraal (Chirayinkeezhu: Saritha, 1984)
 Garbhasreeman (Kottayam: S.P.C.S.)
 Rekhayillatha Oral (Chirayinkeezhu: Saritha, 1984)
 Thiktham, Theekshnam, Thimiram (Kottayam: N.B.S., 1983, collection of three novelettes)
 Bhoomiputhrante Vazhi (Kottayam: DC Books, 1987)
 Ottappalam (Kottayam: Vidyarthi Mithram, 1990)
 Madyakala Kathakal (Kottayam: S.P.C.S., 1994)
 Kathakaladisadaram (Kottayam: Current Books, 1996, 12 stories)
 Ente Paradaivangal (Kottayam: DC Books, 1997, 18 stories)
 Veedinte Nanartham (Trivandrum: Chintha, 1998)
 Kamatheertham (Trivandrum: Maluben, 2001, 23 stories written between 1967 and 2001)
 51 Thiranjedutha Kathakal (Kottayam: S.P.C.S., 2010, 51 stories)
 S.V.yude Kathakal Sampoornam (Trivandrum: Maluben, 2018, complete collection of short stories)

Other 
 Jim Prabhu (Kottayam: DC Books, 1983, Translation of Joseph Conrad's Lord Jim)
 Aa Manushyan (Kottayam: DC Books, 1984, Translation of Amrita Pritam's That Man)
 Chuvanna Akathalathinte Kinavu (Kottayam: DC Books, 1985, Translation of Cao Xueqin's Dream of the Red Chamber)
 Vātsalyarasaṃ C. V. Yude Akhyāyikakaḷil (Kottayam: Current Books, 1995, Study on C. V. Raman Pillai's works)
 Hāsyam Novel Silpathil (Trivandrum: Maluben, 1997, Study on the works of C. V. Raman Pillai, O. Chandhu Menon, Basheer and O. V. Vijayan)
 Malayāla Bhāsha Charitram (Trivandrum: Maluben, 2000, History of Malayalam language)
 Swadeshabhimani (Neyyattinkara: Swadeshabhimani Books, 2016, drama)

Awards
 2017: Kerala Sahitya Akademi Award for Drama – Swadeshabhimani
 2003: Padmarajan Award – "Bandhanasthanaya Anirudhan" (published in Kalakaumudi, 2003)
 2000: Abu Dhabi Sakthi Award - Veedinte Nanartham
 1990: Kerala Sahitya Akademi Award for Story – Bhoomiputhrante Vazhi
 1984: Edasseri Award – Rekhayillatha Oral

References

1945 births
2022 deaths
Malayali people
Indian male short story writers
Writers from Kerala
Malayalam-language writers
Malayalam short story writers
20th-century Indian male writers
20th-century Indian novelists
21st-century Indian male writers
21st-century Indian novelists
Recipients of the Kerala Sahitya Akademi Award
People from Thiruvananthapuram
Recipients of the Abu Dhabi Sakthi Award